The Aeromarine B-90 is an aircraft engine built by the Aeromarine Plane and Motor Company in 1915. Aeromarine made two series of V-8 engines. The B series was developed by Joseph Boland and the L series by Charles F. Willard.

Specifications

References 

1910s aircraft piston engines